Vilhelm Buhl (16 October 1881 – 18 December 1954) was Prime Minister of Denmark from 4 May 1942 to 9 November 1942 as head of the Unity Government (the Cabinet of Vilhelm Buhl I) during the German occupation of Denmark of World War II, until the Nazis ordered him removed. He was Prime Minister again from 5 May 1945 to 7 November 1945 as head of a unity government (the Cabinet of Vilhelm Buhl II) after the liberation of Denmark by the British Field Marshal Montgomery.

Vilhelm Buhl was a member of the Social Democrats. He joined the party while a law student at the University of Copenhagen. Buhl held the post of Finance Minister in the cabinets of Thorvald Stauning from 20 July 1937 to 16 July 1942.

During Nazi Germany's occupation of Denmark, Thorvald Stauning had created a unity government. When Thorvald Stauning died in May 1942, Vilhelm Buhl succeeded him. This government only lasted six months, because of a diplomatic incident, the Telegram Crisis, in which King Christian X sent a short and formal reply to a long birthday telegram from Adolf Hitler. Hitler was outraged by this insult, and as a result, Vilhelm Buhl was replaced by Erik Scavenius. Werner Best was sent to Denmark as a new tough Nazi commander.

After the liberation of Denmark on 5 May 1945, the politicians and the resistance fighters formed a unity government (Cabinet of Vilhelm Buhl II). Many Danes were dissatisfied with the politicians because of their policy of cooperation with the Germans that had dominated at the start of the war, hence the inclusion of the resistance fighters. Notable members of the cabinet included Aksel Larsen, Hans Hedtoft, H. C. Hansen, Knud Kristensen and John Christmas Møller. In social policy, the government presided over the passage of the Housing Obligation Act of August 1945, introduced obligatory allocation of vacant housing to ensure that vacant flats were let in the first instance to those with low incomes, while also establishing tight rent controls. The government also presided over the trials of the people who had cooperated with the Germans, as a result of which 45 persons were executed. After the elections in October 1945 Knud Kristensen became the new prime minister.

References

Kristian Hvidt, Statsministre i Danmark fra 1913 til 1995 (1995)
 Growth to Limits: The Western European Welfare States Since World War II, Volume 4 edited by Peter Flora

External links
 
 

1881 births
1954 deaths
Prime Ministers of Denmark
Danish Finance Ministers
Foreign ministers of Denmark
Danish Justice Ministers
World War II political leaders
Danish people of World War II
Members of the Folketing
Members of the Landsting (Denmark)
People from Fredericia
Burials at Vestre Cemetery, Copenhagen
20th-century Danish politicians